Eupithecia costipicta is a moth in the  family Geometridae. It is found in Afghanistan, India (Sikkim) and China (Hubei, Hunnan). The habitat consists of mountainous areas at altitudes between 2,300 and 3,500 meters.

The wingspan is about 22.5 mm. The forewings are pale buff and the hindwings are dirty white.

References

Moths described in 1893
costipicta
Moths of Asia
Taxa named by William Warren (entomologist)